Sanborn House may refer to:
Sanborn House (Winchester, Massachusetts), listed on the NRHP in Massachusetts
Rev. Peter Sanborn House, Reading, MA, listed on the NRHP in Massachusetts
Sanborn Hall (Delaware, Ohio), listed on the NRHP in Ohio
Henry B. and Ellen M. Sanborn House, Amarillo, TX, listed on the NRHP in Texas